Cecilie Maja Hastrup Karshø, known professionally as Coco O., is a Danish musician best known as the singer in electronic soul duo Quadron. She released her debut album It's a Process in 2021.

Early life 
Cecilie Maja Hastrup Karshø was born and raised in Copenhagen, Denmark. Her father is biracial of Tanzanian descent.

Karshø began singing in kindergarten and aspired to sing professionally from childhood. She first realized that her voice was received positively by others during a secondary school performance of a Bill Withers song. She names Michael Jackson and Lauryn Hill as early inspirations. Karshø's grandfather was a jazz musician.

Career

Quadron 
Performing under the name Coco O., she formed the duo Quadron with Robin Hannibal of Rhye in 2009. The word Quadron comes from archaic Danish "kvadron", a term used to signify persons of "quarter" race, and refers to the fact that both musicians have a biracial parent. Coco O. was the duo's singer and moved to Los Angeles after the release of their debut album. Her voice was referred to by Pitchfork as "sweetly soulful."

Solo work 
Jay-Z selected Coco O. to contribute the song "Where the Wind Blows" to the soundtrack for Baz Luhrmann's The Great Gatsby. She has also worked with Pharrell Williams and provided featured vocals for Tyler, the Creator, Vulfpeck and Joey Dosik.

In 2015 she released her first solo single, "Hardest Thing." Coco O. moved back to Denmark in 2018 and released her debut solo project Dolceacqua on May 25, 2018. The two-song EP has a bossa nova sound. The album was written for an ex-boyfriend and named after the small Italian village where they fell in love. ColorsxStudios described it as "featuring mellow, acoustic guitar accompanied by rich, cinematic strings" and noted the sound is a departure from her previous work with Quadron.

On April 30, 2021, she released her first solo album It's a Process. Zo of Okayplayer heralded the album as "a stunningly intimate showcase of the singer’s voice across a range of compositions pulling from all eras of r&b and soul."

Other ventures 
Coco O. appeared as a contestant on dancing competition TV series Vild med dans in 2019. She and her partner Morten Kjeldgaard finished in second place.

Discography

Albums

EPs

with Quadron

Other appearances

References

External links 
Official Instagram
Coco O. on Discogs

Year of birth missing (living people)
Living people
Danish sopranos
Soul singers
Danish women singer-songwriters
Musicians from Copenhagen
Danish electronic musicians
21st-century Danish women singers